Fabrício Ramos da Silva, known as Fabrício Silva or simply Fabrício (born 29 March 1995) is a Brazilian football player who most recently played for Confiança.

Club career
He made his professional debut in the Segunda Liga for Olhanense on 21 September 2016 in a game against Varzim.

References

External links

1995 births
Living people
Brazilian footballers
Associação Atlética Caldense players
S.C. Olhanense players
Associação Desportiva Confiança players
Brazilian expatriate footballers
Expatriate footballers in Portugal
Liga Portugal 2 players
Campeonato Brasileiro Série C players
Association football midfielders